Ekehaar is a village in the Dutch province of Drenthe. It is a part of the municipality of Aa en Hunze, and lies about 6 km south of Assen.

History 
The village was first mentioned in 1423 as Hekehair, and means "sandy ridge with oak trees".

Ekehaar was home to 35 people in 1840.

Ekehaar also has a primary school, OBS De Flint. The school is meant as a school for children from Ekehaar, Amen, Eldersloo, Eleveld and other surrounding villages.

References

Populated places in Drenthe
Aa en Hunze